The Greek Revival Cottage is a historic house located in Leal Park in Urbana, Illinois. Built circa 1860, the house is the last remaining Greek Revival home in Champaign-Urbana. As Champaign County was settled in the 1850s, the same time the Greek Revival style's popularity declined, few houses in the county were built in the style. The house's front entrance features a portico, the house's main Greek Revival element, with a dentillated pediment supported by square pillars. While the house was originally located at 1205 W. Springfield, it was relocated to the park in the 1970s to save it from demolition.

The house was added to the National Register of Historic Places on October 20, 1977.

References

Houses on the National Register of Historic Places in Illinois
Greek Revival houses in Illinois
Houses completed in 1860
National Register of Historic Places in Champaign County, Illinois
Houses in Champaign County, Illinois
Buildings and structures in Urbana, Illinois